Tappeh is a village in Azadegan Rural District, in the Central District of Galugah County, Mazandaran Province, Iran. At the 2006 census, its population was 78, in 23 families.

References 

Populated places in Galugah County